Cornelius Stephen Creeden (July 21, 1915 – November 30, 1969) was an American professional baseball player. He played five games in Major League Baseball with the Boston Braves in 1943.

Biography
A native of Danvers, Massachusetts, Creeden attended Danvers High School and St. John's Preparatory School. Creeden played summer baseball for two seasons in the Cape Cod Baseball League (CCBL). In 1938 with Orleans, he batted over .400 to lead the CCBL. In 1939, Creeden again flirted with the .400 mark while leading Falmouth to the CCBL title. In 1941, he was appointed athletic director at the Falmouth community center.

Creeden made his major league debut with the Boston Braves in 1943. He pinch hit in five games over the span of eight days, and did not play in the field. In his five plate appearances, he recorded one hit, one walk, and one RBI. His only major league hit came on May 2 in the first game of the Braves' doubleheader against the Philadelphia Phillies at Shibe Park. With the game tied at 1–1 in the top of the ninth, Creeden delivered the game-winning RBI, a single off Phillies hurler Si Johnson that scored Chuck Workman to give the Braves the lead. Creeden was lifted for a pinch runner, and the Braves went on to win, 3–1. In the second half of the twinbill, Creeden reached base via walk off Johnny Podgajny in the 12th inning, and was again removed for a pinch runner.

Creeden spent the remainder of the 1943 season with the Hollywood Stars of the Pacific Coast League (PCL), and in 1944 played for the PCL's Seattle Rainiers. He went on to play for the Little Rock Travelers and Atlanta Crackers of the Southern Association. In the summer of 1949, Creeden played for the Galt Terriers of the semipro Intercounty League in southern Ontario.

Creeden died in Santa Ana, California in 1969 at the age of 54.

References

External links

Boston Braves players
1915 births
1969 deaths
Baseball players from Massachusetts
Major League Baseball outfielders
Bradford Bees players
Utica Braves players
Hollywood Stars players
Little Rock Travelers players
Seattle Rainiers players
Atlanta Crackers players
Port Chester Clippers players
St. Hyacinthe Saints players
Cape Cod Baseball League players (pre-modern era)
Orleans Firebirds players
Falmouth Commodores players
Florence Steelers players